Reassembly is a 2D open world space shooter PC game, created by video game developer Anisoptera Games. The game is available on Steam or from the developer's website via Humble Widget. Native versions are available for Microsoft Windows, Mac OS, and Linux. It was released on February 19, 2015.

Gameplay

Main game
Players build their ships out of various geometric pieces, including hull, armor, thrusters, weapons, shield projectors, and various other functional components. Each component gives a unique attribute or ability to the ship. Reassemblys creative, modular ship building has been compared to playing with Lego. The in-game world is a single large open "galaxy", populated with rival factions. Players progress through the game by collecting resources, building a fleet, capturing territory, and activating damaged space stations.

Tournaments
In tournament mode, players can select ships that they have created or downloaded from other players, and pit them against each other in pool mode or bracket mode. The ships in tournament mode are not controlled by the player, rather, the AI decides how to attack and defend depending on how the ships have been designed and the behavior of the opponents they are facing.  Several larger online tournaments have been organized and posted on YouTube and/or streamed on Twitch as well as a series of official tournaments hosted by the developer, Arthur Danskin.

Development

Initial development
During the alpha testing the game was originally being developed under the name Gamma Void. Later in development, the developer of the game decided to change the name to Reassembly. The new name was chosen for the reason that it clearly states an important feature of the game, when a ship is damaged, it is reassembled by tractor beaming in any nearby transients parts that floating around, and rebuilding ships based on the blueprint design created by the player on the fleet configuration screen. A crowdfunding campaign on Kickstarter has raised about $35,308 to further contributes to the effort on the development of the game.

Further development and modding support
In April 2015, developer Arthur Danskin announced the ability to add modding support into the game. This feature allowed players to create and publish their own custom factions, ships, and features. Modding support is available in the "2nd time Beta testing" for the game on Steam, where users who have bought the game have an option to download and test the "second Beta".

References

External links
Official website

Open-world video games
Shooter video games
Space combat simulators
Strategy video games
2015 video games
Windows games
MacOS games
Linux games
Video games with Steam Workshop support
Video games developed in the United States
Video games using procedural generation